Nazmiye Muslu Muratlı, aka Nazmiye Muratlı, (born Nazmiye Muslu on June 13, 1979) is a Turkish female powerlifter. She is the current world record holder in 40 kg division, set at the 2012 Paralympics, where she took the gold medal. She competes for Konya Meram Belediyespor.

Results
https://olympics.com/tokyo-2020/paralympic-games/en/results/powerlifting/athlete-profile-n1729561-muratli-nazmiye.htm

Paralympic Games

1	–41 kg	2016	Rio de Janeiro, BRA	104

1	–40 kg	2012	London, GBR	106

4	–40 kg	2008	Beijing, CHN	90.0

World Championships

1	–41 kg	2014	Dubai, UAE	103.0

1	–40 kg	2010	Kuala Lumpur, MAS	105.0

2	–45 kg	2019	Nur-Sultan, KAZ	116.0

2	–45 kg	2017	Mexico City, MEX	107.0

8	–44 kg	2006	Busan, KOR	60.0

European Open Championships

1	–50 kg	2018	Berck-sur-Mer, FRA	111

Early years
Nazmiye Muslu was born in Konya in 1979. A paraplegic and dependent on wheelchair, she completed her primary education in her hometown.

She began powerlifting by chance through a friend, who insisted she come with her to the workouts. She abandoned the trainings in the beginnings since it was very hard for her. However, her mother and later her father convinced Nazmiye to resume the training activities.

Career history
Only three months after her beginning again with powerlifting, she was admitted to the national team, and was taken to the European championship held in Portugal without her family's and even her own knowledge before. She took the bronze medal at her international debut.

Muratlı was national champion in 2005 and 2006. She won a bronze medal in 2005 and a gold medal in 2007 at the European championship.

At the 2008 Paralympics in Beijing, China, Muratlı became fourth. At the 2012 London Paralympics, she broke her own world record with 109.0 kg lift and took the gold medal. Lifting 104.0 kg in the 41 kg event at the 2016 Rio Paralympics, she set a world record and captured the gold medal. She became so Turkey's first ever sportsperson to win a gold medal in two Paralympics.

References

1979 births
Living people
Sportspeople from Konya
People with paraplegia
Turkish sportswomen
Turkish powerlifters
Female powerlifters
Paralympic powerlifters of Turkey
Powerlifters at the 2008 Summer Paralympics
Powerlifters at the 2012 Summer Paralympics
Powerlifters at the 2016 Summer Paralympics
Paralympic gold medalists for Turkey
Medalists at the 2012 Summer Paralympics
Medalists at the 2016 Summer Paralympics
Paralympic medalists in powerlifting
Powerlifters at the 2020 Summer Paralympics